= Diskordia =

- Cover of Diskordia volume 1

Publication information
- Schedule: ongoing
- Publication date: 2011
- No. of issues: 14

Creative team
- Created by: Rivenis

Diskordia is an ongoing surrealist fantasy web comic book series created by Andrew Blackman (credited as Rivenis) that explores themes such as the nature of reality, consciousness and self-determination. The first issue was released in 2011.

== Synopsis ==
The story follows the main character the socially maladjusted, cynical and sarcastic Jackal Black as he travels through a portal into a strange world called Diskordia which is described as a transit hub between dimensions. He meets other characters along the way, including Squid Girl, a talking cigar-smoking hat, a journalist interviewing the Mysterious Iverna Deskerna, and the Mephys group, a mega-multimedia corporation with many dark secrets.

== Characters ==
- Jackal Black – A college student who is trying to escape from being framed for murder inters into a dark world called Diskdia.
- Squid Girl – A naked girl with a Squid on her head who meets up with Jackal after he enters Diskordia.
- Iverna Deskerna – The mysterious CEO of the Mephys group and is the main villain of the series.
- Vernon Cutter

== Reception ==
The comic has received favorable reviews, with ComicBookResources.com saying "Diskordia is a delightfully hypnagogic story with some often epic artwork", GeeksOfDoom.com calling it a "crazy good graphic novel", and HorrorTalk.com saying, "The artwork is what really stands out in Diskordia. It's unlike anything I've seen before."

== Notes ==
The comic book had a successful crowd-funding campaign in 2016 and in 2017, neither of which has been fulfilled.
